Qambar was a companion Imam Ali (a.s). According to some traditions, he was Ali's groom, He was killed by Al-Hajjaj ibn Yusuf.

References

Arabian slaves and freedmen